This article lists feature-length British films and full-length documentaries that have had their premieres in 2018 and were at least partly produced by Great Britain or the United Kingdom. It does not feature short films, medium-length films, made-for-TV films, pornographic films, filmed theater, VR films and interactive films like Black Mirror: Bandersnatch. It also does not include films screened in previous years that had official release dates in 2018.

British co-productions like Bohemian Rhapsody, Fantastic Beasts: The Crimes of Grindelwald, and Mamma Mia! Here We Go Again garnered positive reviews and collectively grossed more than $1.5 billion in the Box Office worldwide. Small independent films like The Wife, Three Identical Strangers and At Eternity's Gate performed well in the Specialty Box Office, screening in a limited number of theaters.

2018 was expected to be the best year for British box office since 1971 with Avengers: Infinity War, Mamma Mia! Here We Go Again, Incredibles 2, Black Panther, Bohemian Rhapsody, Jurassic World: Fallen Kingdom, Peter Rabbit and The Greatest Showman breaking £40 million at the British box office.

Also included is an overview of five awards ceremonies which are major events in British film: the Academy Awards, British Academy Film Awards, Critics' Choice Awards, Golden Globe Awards and Screen Actors Guild Awards.

Film premieres

January – March

April – June

July – September

October – December

Other premieres

Culturally British Films
The following list comprises films not produced by Great Britain or the United Kingdom but is strongly associated with British culture. The films in this list should fulfill at least 3 of the following criteria:
 The film is adapted from a British source material.
 The story is at least partially set in the United Kingdom.
 The film was at least partially shot in the United Kingdom.
 Many of the film's cast and crew members are British.

British winners

Listed here are the British winners and nominees at the four most prestigious film award ceremonies in the English-speaking world: the Academy Awards, British Academy Film Awards, Golden Globe Awards and Screen Actors Guild Awards, that were held during 2018, celebrating the best films of 2017. The British nominations were led by Three Billboards Outside Ebbing, Missouri, Dunkirk, and Darkest Hour, with Three Billboards Outside Ebbing, Missouri winning awards in the major categories and Dunkirk going on to win large numbers of technical awards, whilst Gary Oldman won multiple best leading actor awards for his portrayal of Sir Winston Churchill in Darkest Hour. British films did, however, notably lose out to The Shape of Water from USA.

Academy Awards
The 90th Academy Awards honoring the best films of 2017 were held on March 4, 2018.

British winners:
 Darkest Hour (Best Actor, Best Makeup and Hairstyling)
 Dunkirk (Best Sound Editing, Best Sound Mixing, Best Film Editing)
 The Silent Child (Best Live Action Short Film)
 Three Billboards Outside Ebbing, Missouri (Best Actress, Best Supporting Actor)
 Alex Gibson (Best Sound Editing) – Dunkirk
 Chris Overton (Best Live Action Short Film) – The Silent Child
 David Malinowski (Best Makeup and Hairstyling) – Darkest Hour
 Gary Oldman (Best Actor) – Darkest Hour
 Lucy Sibbick (Best Makeup and Hairstyling) – Darkest Hour
 Rachel Shenton (Best Live Action Short Film) – The Silent Child
 Roger Deakins (Best cinematography) – Blade Runner 2049

British nominees:
 All the Money in the World (Best Supporting Actor)
 Baby Driver (Best Sound Editing, Best Sound Mixing, Best Film Editing)
 Darkest Hour (Best Picture)
 Dunkirk (Best Picture, Best Director)
 Revolting Rhymes (Best Animated Short Film)
 Three Billboards Outside Ebbing, Missouri (Best Picture, Best Supporting Actor, Best Original Screenplay)
 Anthony McCarten (Best Picture) – Darkest Hour
 Christopher Nolan (Best Picture, Best Director) – Dunkirk
 Daniel Day-Lewis (Best Actor) – Phantom Thread
 Daniel Kaluuya (Best Actor) – Get Out
 Daniel Lupi (Best Picture) – Phantom Thread
 Daniel Phillips (Best Makeup and Hairstyling) – Victoria & Abdul
 Douglas Urbanski (Best Picture) – Darkest Hour
 Emma Thomas  (Best Picture) – Dunkirk
 Eric Fellner (Best Picture) – Darkest Hour
 Graham Broadbent (Best Picture) – Three Billboards Outside Ebbing, Missouri
 Hugh Welchman (Best Animated Feature Film) – Loving Vincent
 Ivan Mactaggart (Best Animated Feature Film) – Loving Vincent
 Jacqueline Durran (Best Costume Design) – Beauty and the Beast and Darkest Hour
 JoAnne Sellar (Best Picture) – Phantom Thread
 Jonathan Amos (Best Film Editing) – Baby Driver
 Jonny Greenwood (Best Original Score) – Phantom Thread
 Julian Slater (Best Sound Editing, Best Sound Mixing) – Baby Driver
 Katie Spencer (Best Production Design) – Beauty and the Beast and Darkest Hour
 Lesley Manville (Best Supporting Actress) – Phantom Thread
 Lisa Bruce (Best Picture) – Darkest Hour
 Lou Sheppard (Best Makeup and Hairstyling) – Victoria & Abdul
 Martin McDonagh (Best Picture, Best Original Screenplay) – Three Billboards Outside Ebbing, Missouri
 Nathan Crowley (Best Production Design) – Dunkirk
 Neal Scanlan (Best Visual Effects) – Star Wars: The Last Jedi
 Peter Czernin (Best Picture) – Three Billboards Outside Ebbing, Missouri
 Sally Hawkins (Best Actress) – The Shape of Water
 Sarah Greenwood (Best Production Design) – Beauty and the Beast and Darkest Hour
 Theo Green (Best Sound Editing) – Blade Runner 2049
 Tim Bevan (Best Picture) – Darkest Hour
 Tim Cavagin (Best Sound Mixing) – Baby Driver

British Academy Film Awards
The 71st British Academy Film Awards honoring the best films of 2017 were held on 18 February 2018.

British winners:
 Baby Driver (Best Editing)
 Darkest Hour (Best Actor in a Leading Role, Best Makeup and Hair)
 Dunkirk (Best Sound)
 I Am Not a Witch (Outstanding Debut by a British Writer, Director or Producer)
 Three Billboards Outside Ebbing, Missouri (Best Film, Best Actress in a Leading Role, Best Actor in a Supporting Role, Best Original Screenplay, Outstanding British Film)
 Alex Gibson (Best Sound) – Dunkirk
 Daniel Kaluuya (EE Rising Star Award)
 David Malinowski (Best Makeup and Hair) – Darkest Hour 
 Gary Oldman (Best Actor in a Leading Role) – Darkest Hour
 Graham Broadbent (Best Film, Outstanding British Film) – Three Billboards Outside Ebbing, Missouri
 Ivana Primorac (Best Makeup and Hair) – Darkest Hour 
 Jonathan Amos (Best Editing) – Baby Driver
 Lucy Sibbick (Best Makeup and Hair) – Darkest Hour 
 Martin McDonagh (Best Film, Best Original Screenplay, Outstanding British Film) – Three Billboards Outside Ebbing, Missouri
 Paloma Baeza (Best Short Animation) – Poles Apart
 Pete Czernin (Best Film, Outstanding British Film) – Three Billboards Outside Ebbing, Missouri
 Roger Deakins (Best Cinematography) – Blade Runner 2049
 Rungano Nyoni (Outstanding Debut by a British Writer, Director or Producer) – I Am Not a Witch

British nominees:
 All the Money in the World (Best Actor in a Supporting Role)
 Baby Driver (Best Sound)
 Darkest Hour (Best Film, Best Actor in a Leading Role, Best Actress in a Supporting Role, Best Cinematography, Outstanding British Film, Best Original Music, Best Production Design, Best Costume Design)
 The Death of Stalin (Best Adapted Screenplay, Outstanding British Film)
 Dunkirk (Best Film, Best Director, Best Cinematography, Best Original Music, Best Production Design, Best Special Visual Effects, Best Editing) 
 Film Stars Don't Die in Liverpool (Best Actor in a Leading Role, Best Actress in a Leading Role, Best Adapted Screenplay)
 God's Own Country (Outstanding British Film)
 Jawbone (Outstanding Debut by a British Writer, Director or Producer)
 Lady Macbeth (Outstanding Debut by a British Writer, Director or Producer, Outstanding British Film)
 Paddington 2 (Best Actor in a Supporting Role, Best Adapted Screenplay, Outstanding British Film)
 Three Billboards Outside Ebbing, Missouri (Best Director, Best Actor in a Supporting Role, Best Cinematography, Best Editing)
 Andrew Lockley (Best Special Visual Effects) – Dunkirk Armando Iannucci (Best Adapted Screenplay, Outstanding British Film) – The Death of Stalin 
 Ben Davis (Best Cinematography) – The Death of Stalin 
 Benjamin Wallfisch (Best Original Music) – Blade Runner 2049 Chris Corbould (Best Special Visual Effects) – Star Wars: The Last Jedi Christopher Nolan (Best Film, Best Director) – Dunkirk Daniel Day-Lewis (Best Actor in a Leading Role) – Phantom Thread Daniel Kaluuya (Best Actor in a Leading Role) – Get Out Daniel Phillips (Best Makeup and Hair) – Victoria & Abdul David Schneider (Best Adapted Screenplay, Outstanding British Film) – The Death of Stalin 
 Florence Pugh (EE Rising Star Award)
 Gary Fettis (Best Production Design) – Dunkirk Hugh Grant (Best Actor in a Supporting Role) – Paddington 2 Ian Martin (Best Adapted Screenplay, Outstanding British Film) – The Death of Stalin 
 Jacqueline Durran (Best Costume Design) – Darkest Hour, Beauty and the Beast Jamie Bell (Best Actor in a Leading Role) – Film Stars Don't Die in Liverpool 
 Joe Walker (Best Editing) – Blade Runner 2049
 Jonny Greenwood (Best Original Music) – Phantom Thread
 Johnny Harris (Outstanding Debut by a British Writer, Director or Producer) – Jawbone
 Josh O'Connor (EE Rising Star Award)
 Julian Slater (Best Sound) – Baby Driver
 Katie Spencer (Best Production Design) – Darkest Hour, Beauty and the Beast
 Kevin Loader (Outstanding British Film) – The Death of Stalin 
 Kristin Scott Thomas (Best Actress in a Supporting Role) – Darkest Hour
 Lesley Manville (Best Actress in a Supporting Role) – Phantom Thread
 Lisa Bruce (Outstanding Debut by a British Writer, Director or Producer) – The Ghoul
 Lou Sheppard (Best Makeup and Hair) – Victoria & Abdul
 Martin McDonagh (Best Director) – Three Billboards Outside Ebbing, Missouri 
 Mary H. Ellis (Best Sound) – Baby Driver
 Matt Greenhalgh (Best Adapted Screenplay) – Film Stars Don't Die in Liverpool 
 Nathan Crowley (Best Production Design) – Dunkirk
 Neal Scanlan (Best Special Visual Effects) – Star Wars: The Last Jedi
 Paul Corbould (Best Special Visual Effects) – Dunkirk
 Paul King (Best Adapted Screenplay, Outstanding British Film) – Paddington 2
 Sally Hawkins (Best Actress in a Leading Role) – The Shape of Water
 Sarah Greenwood (Best Production Design) – Beauty and the Beast, Darkest Hour
 Simon Farnaby (Best Adapted Screenplay, Outstanding British Film) – Paddington 2
 Stuart Wilson (Best Sound) – Star Wars: The Last Jedi
 Theo Green (Best Sound) – Blade Runner 2049
 Tim Bevan (Best Film, Outstanding British Film) – Darkest Hour
 Tim Cavagin (Best Sound) – Baby Driver
 Tom Meeten (Outstanding Debut by a British Writer, Director or Producer) – The Ghoul

Critics' Choice Awards
The 23rd Critics' Choice Awards was presented on January 11, 2018.

British winners:
 Baby Driver (Best Editing) (tied with Dunkirk)
 Darkest Hour (Best Actor, Best Hair and Makeup)
 Dunkirk (Best Editing) (tied with Baby Driver)
 Three Billboards Outside Ebbing, Missouri (Best Actress, Best Supporting Actor, Best Acting Ensemble)
 Gary Oldman (Best Actor) – Darkest Hour
 Jonathan Amos (Best Editing) – Baby Driver
 Roger Deakins (Best Cinematography) – Blade Runner 2049

British nominees:
 Baby Driver (Best Action Movie)
 Battle of the Sexes (Best Actor in a Comedy, Best Actress in a Comedy)
 Darkest Hour (Best Picture, Best Score)
 Dunkirk (Best Picture, Best Director, Best Acting Ensemble, Best Cinematography, Best Production Design, Best Visual Effects, Best Score)
 Loving Vincent (Best Animated Feature)
 Murder on the Orient Express (Best Production Design)
 Three Billboards Outside Ebbing, Missouri (Best Picture, Best Director, Best Original Screenplay)
 Benjamin Wallfisch (Best Score) – Blade Runner 2049
 Christopher Nolan (Best Director) – Dunkirk
 Dafne Keen (Best Young Actor/Actress) – Logan
 Daniel Day-Lewis (Best Actor) – Phantom Thread
 Daniel Kaluuya (Best Actor) – Get Out
 Jack Thorne (Best Adapted Screenplay) – Wonder
 Jacqueline Durran (Best Costume Design) – Beauty and the Beast
 Joe Walker (Best Editing) – Blade Runner 2049 
 Jonny Greenwood (Best Original Score) – Phantom Thread
 Katie Spencer (Best Production Design) – Beauty and the Beast 
 Lindy Hemming (Best Costume Design) – Dunkirk 
 Mark Tildesley (Best Production Design) – Phantom Thread
 Nathan Crowley (Best Production Design) – Dunkirk
 Patrick Stewart (Best Supporting Actor) – Logan
 Rebecca Alleway (Best Production Design) – Murder on the Orient Express
 Sally Hawkins (Best Actress) – The Shape of Water
 Sarah Greenwood (Best Production Design) – Beauty and the Beast

Golden Globe Awards
The 75th Golden Globe Awards was presented on January 7, 2018.

British winners:
 Three Billboards Outside Ebbing, Missouri (Best Motion Picture, Best Performance in a Motion Picture – Drama, Best Supporting Performance in a Motion Picture, Best Screenplay)
 Gary Oldman (Best Performance in a Motion Picture – Drama) – Darkest Hour
 Martin McDonagh (Best Screenplay) – Three Billboards Outside Ebbing, Missouri

British nominees:
 All the Money in the World (Best Performance in a Motion Picture – Drama, Best Supporting Performance in a Motion Picture, Best Director)
 Baby Driver (Best Performance in a Motion Picture – Musical or Comedy)
 Battle of the Sexes (Best Performance in a Motion Picture – Musical or Comedy)
 Dunkirk (Best Motion Picture, Best Director, Best Original Score) 
 Loving Vincent (Best Animated Feature Film)
 Three Billboards Outside Ebbing, Missouri (Best Director, Best Original Score) 
 Christopher Nolan (Best Director) – Dunkirk
 Daniel Day-Lewis (Best Performance in a Motion Picture – Drama) – Phantom Thread
 Daniel Kaluuya (Best Performance in a Motion Picture – Musical or Comedy) – Get Out
 Helen Mirren (Best Performance in a Motion Picture – Musical or Comedy) – The Leisure Seeker
 Jonny Greenwood (Best Original Score) – Phantom Thread
 Judi Dench (Best Performance in a Motion Picture – Musical or Comedy) – Victoria & Abdul
 Martin McDonagh (Best Director) – Three Billboards Outside Ebbing, Missouri
 Sally Hawkins (Best Performance in a Motion Picture – Drama) – The Shape of Water
 Ridley Scott (Best Director) – All the Money in the World

Screen Actors Guild Awards
The 24th Screen Actors Guild Awards was presented on January 21, 2018.
 
British winners:
 Gary Oldman (Outstanding Performance by a Male Actor in a Leading Role)
 Darkest Hour (Outstanding Performance by a Male Actor in a Leading Role)
 Three Billboards Outside Ebbing, Missouri (Outstanding Performance by a Female Actor in a Leading Role, Outstanding Performance by a Male Actor in a Supporting Role, Outstanding Performance by a Cast in a Motion Picture)

British nominees:
 Carey Mulligan (Outstanding Performance by a Cast in a Motion Picture) – Mudbound
 Daniel Kaluuya (Outstanding Performance by a Male Actor in a Leading Role, Outstanding Performance by a Cast in a Motion Picture) – Get Out
 Judi Dench (Outstanding Performance by a Female Actor in a Leading Role) – Victoria & Abdul
 Sally Hawkins (Outstanding Performance by a Female Actor in a Leading Role) – The Shape of Water
 Baby Driver (Outstanding Performance by a Stunt Ensemble in a Motion Picture)
 Battle of the Sexes (Outstanding Performance by a Male Actor in a Supporting Role)
 Dunkirk (Outstanding Performance by a Stunt Ensemble in a Motion Picture)
 Three Billboards Outside Ebbing, Missouri (Outstanding Performance by a Male Actor in a Supporting Role)
 Victoria & Abdul (Outstanding Performance by a Female Actor in a Leading Role)

See also
Lists of British films
2018 in film
2018 in British music
2018 in British radio
2018 in British television
2018 in the United Kingdom
List of 2018 box office number-one films in the United Kingdom
List of British films of 2017
List of British films of 2019

References

External links
 

2018
Lists of 2018 films by country or language